Treworld is a hamlet west of Lesnewth, Cornwall, England, United Kingdom.

References

Hamlets in Cornwall